Gachineh-ye Bala (also Romanized as Gachīneh-ye Bālā; also known as Gachīneh) is a village in Bemani Rural District, Byaban District, Minab County, Hormozgan Province, Iran. At the 2006 census, its population was 113, in 17 families.

References 

Populated places in Minab County